Arctic Anthropology is a peer-reviewed academic journal covering research on the archaeology, ethnology, and physical anthropology of arctic and subarctic peoples. It is indexed in the Social Sciences Citation Index and Current Contents/Social & Behavioral Sciences. According to the Journal Citation Reports, the journal has a 2019 impact factor of 0.188.

The journal was established in 1962 by Chester S. Chard and its current editor-in-chief is Christyann M. Darwent (University of California, Davis). It is published biannually in summer and winter.

References

External links 
 

Biannual journals
Publications established in 1962
Anthropology journals
Culture of the Arctic
University of Wisconsin–Madison
English-language journals